Wild Ken Hill is a rewilding and regenerative agriculture project located in Norfolk, England, at the edge of The Wash.

History

The name Ken Hill probably derives from a chieftain or landowner with the Anglo-Saxon name Cena. The site has been inhabited from ancient times, with hoards including gold torcs, ingot rings, coins, bracelets and scrap metal from the last two centuries BC being found by archaeologists at Ken Hill.

The farm has been owned by the Buscall family since the 1870s.

The farm

Wild Ken Hill is a lowland farm with some grassland, meadow, heathland and shrub. In the middle of the farm, arable farming and intensive grazing have been replaced with low density herbivores (Red Poll cattle, Tamworth pigs, Exmoor ponies). Woodland thinning encourages wood pasture. European beavers have been reintroduced within an enclosure.

The farm also manages freshwater marsh, river valleys and woodland in a traditional manner in the west of the farm. The eastern part of the farm is used for regenerative agriculture, where "we aim to repair soil health to sequester carbon and boost biodiversity, whilst also delivering good, sustainable yields with minimal use of chemical inputs."

Media appearances
Wild Ken Hill was used for the filming of the BBC series Springwatch, Autumnwatch and Winterwatch in 2021–22.

References

External links

Land Use Model

Organic farming in the United Kingdom
Tourist attractions in Norfolk
Archaeological sites in Norfolk
Companies based in Norfolk
Animal reintroduction
Rewilding
Environmentalism in England